Hungerball is a football-based hybrid sport played in New Zealand, Australia, Canada and the UK.

Hungerball is governed by Hungerball Federation Inc, is registered with the WIPO and is trademarked in countries across the world.

Elements 
Hungerball is played inside an inflatable, fully enclosed arena, with six small goals.

In line with FIFA's age guidelines, the footballs used are relative to the age of the players.

The game consists of six players, all defending one goal each. One ball is used and players cannot use their hands.

Origin 
Hungerball was created in Auckland, New Zealand. It is based on a game the co-founder and psychologist, Andu Iordache played as a child in Romania, all-in-all, where children played a football game on the street until there was only one person left.

The name Hungerball was created by Andu's son and Hungerball's co-founder Toma Iordache. It comes from the game's aim of improving participants' hunger for possession of the ball while also referencing The Hunger Games. 

Hungerball is called Hia Pōro in te reo Māori.

Early adoption 
In 2015, Hungerball launched in New Zealand.

Hungerball launched in Brisbane, Australia in 2016 and in Muskoka Woods, Canada in 2018.

In 2017, it was first played by Mangere Refugee Resettlement Centre, church youth groups and tertiary students at AUT.

Refugees as Survivors New Zealand uses Hungerball to provide people from refugee backgrounds with access to quality, culturally-sensitive mental health services to assist with positive resettlement in Aotearoa. 

In January 2018, New Zealand national football league team Team Wellington adopted Hungerball as a children's holiday soccer programme.

The game is played at schools in its native country, New Zealand in Auckland, Wellington and Dunedin.

In 2018, Hungerball toured in England and Whitby High School hosted a tournament in September 2018.

Recognition 

In 2017 Hungerball featured on New Zealand children's programme What Now as part of the Anchor AIMS Games International Sporting Championships. It has featured on the Philippines public news.

Andu Iordache has presented Hungerball in psychology talks centred around athletic development in young children and teenagers.

In 2019, Hungerball was a finalist and runner up in the Innovation in Sport category of the 2019 Massey University Harbour Excellence Awards.

Types of games 
There are currently two main types of Hungerball games; "competition" and "social".

During competition games, there are two ways to play:

 There is a fixed time period. The person who scores the highest number of goals, minus goals conceded - wins.
 It is played as an elimination challenge. Upon conceding three goals, the player is eliminated until there is only one left, who is then the winner.

During social games, players in large groups use a fast rotation system whereby whoever concedes is replaced by someone in a line waiting to get on the pitch.

There are then multiple social games for players which are based on training and development.

The rules are:

Singles – 1 vs 1 x 6 (Hungerball meets soccer)

 Dice throw decides which of the six players starts from the centre.
 Other players to remain in their goals, can come out once the ball is touched.
 One ball, no hands.
 Players can score in any of the other five goals.
 One point added for each goal scored, one point taken off for goal conceded.
 Own goal counts as goal conceded (only).
 Player who concedes a goal resumes play from the centre.
 Handball sanctioned with penalty shot to empty goal of guilty player from goal of player who last touched ball prior to handball.
 Similarly, fault sanctioned with penalty shot into empty goal of guilty player.
 If responsibility or benefit of fault or handball unable to be established, dice throw to decide who resumes play.

Team

 2 vs 2 x 3 – two goals per team – similar to challenges for individuals.
 3 vs 3 – three goals per team, best team wins.”

Field hockey adaptation

In New Zealand, Hungerball was adapted to field hockey. It plays with the same rules as the soccer version but with the inclusion of a hockey ball and bat per player instead of a conventional football.

In January 2019, Hungerball was included for use Black Sticks NZ fun events.

Popularity 
Hungerball has been implemented in professional football teams' training methods, including Team Wellington. 

New Zealand soccer club Western AFC included Hungerball in its 2018 Christchurch Fit4football player welfare roadshow. 

In 2018, Whitby High School received 7075 GBP from Cheshire Community Foundation to engage learners in Hungerball. The project had a dual purpose of promoting informal exercise of the school population plus focused work with groups of vulnerable learners. The grant paid for equipment and venue hire, and staff time.

Hungerball has been recognized in Germany and Italy, gaining interest in their online communities.

In 2019, Counties Manukau independent KiwiSport Advisory Group awarded funding to Hungerball, to help provide new or increased organised sport opportunities for young people aged 5 to 18 years. The third round of 2019 regional KiwiSport funding applications, provided further funding to make Hungerball accessible across the Auckland region. In 2021, Hungerball was funded by Aktive NZ to make the sport accessible to Auckland schools.

In 2020, Hungerball New Zealand partnered with The Sir Ray Avery Foundation to promote Amigo Nutrition and physical exercise for New Zealand children. In the same year, Hungerball was first played by vulnerable students at Rosehill Satellite Unit, Papakura High School, using soft equipment and using any skills to score or block goals.

Hungerball is a popular game for community events. In 2021, it was a feature of New Zealand Eid Day celebration at Auckland's Eden Park. Hungerball collaborates with other organisations such as Friends of Football to support for innovative football projects that might otherwise not proceed.

See also 

 Hybrid sports
 Handball

References

Hybrid sports
Sports introduced in the 21st century